The Fifty-fifth Oklahoma Legislature was the 2015 meeting of the legislative branch of the government of Oklahoma, which began with an organizational day on January 6, 2015. The first session met in February 2015 in the Oklahoma State Capitol in Oklahoma City during the first year of the second administration of Governor Mary Fallin. After the 2014 elections, the Republican Party held more than two-thirds of the seats in the Oklahoma Senate and the Oklahoma House of Representatives.

Dates of sessions
Organizational day: January 6, 2015
First session: February 2-May 22, 2015
Previous: 54th Legislature • Next: 56th Legislature

Major legislation

Enacted
2015 Legislative Session
Budget - HB 2244 contained the state budget that begins July 1, 2015 and ends July 1, 2016.
Abortion - HB 1409 increased the time for voluntary and informed consent before an abortion from 24 to 72 hours and required abortion facilities with a website to link to the state's website, "A Woman's Right to know."
Abortion - HB 1721 outlawed abortions in which doctors use forceps or other medical devices to dismember a living fetus in the womb, except when a dismemberment abortion is necessary to prevent a serious health risk to the mother.
Criminal procedure - HB 1518 allows judges to impose shorter sentences for some nonviolent crimes.
Criminal procedure - HB 1548 allows a judge to reduce the sentence of any inmate who was originally sentenced for a drug charge and ordered to complete the Drug Offender Work Camp at the Bill Johnson Correctional Facility if the judge is satisfied the best interests of the public will not be jeopardized.
Drugs - HB 1948 requires doctors to check a Prescription Monitoring Program (PMP) database before writing prescriptions for potentially dangerous and addictive drugs like oxycodone. 
Public safety - HB 1965 makes driving while texting a primary offense in Oklahoma with a fine of $100 for a first offense.
Education - SB 782 allows public school districts the ability to create public charter schools.
Education - SB 630 amended the state Reading Sufficiency Act to eliminate social promotion for students in the third grade who do not demonstrate reading proficiency.
Public safety - HB 2168 allows state licensing agencies discretion in allowing individuals with felony convictions to receive a professional license.
Corrections - HB 1630 allows the Oklahoma Department of Corrections to negotiate with county jails to house state prisons before transfer to private prisons.
Budget - SB 189 requires state agencies to use performance-informed budgeting when submitting annual budget requests. 
Taxation - HB 2181 establish an Incentive Evaluation Commission which is required to review all tax credits offered to businesses at least once every four years.
Taxation - SB 806 requires all future business tax incentives to contain measurable goals.
Voting - SB 313 allows citizens with a driver's license to register to vote over the internet.
Unions - HB 1749 prohibits all state agencies from collecting union dues for its employees via payroll deductions.
Taxation - SB 498 eliminates the property tax exemption for wind energy production facilities.
Taxation - SB 502 eliminates tax credits for wind energy companies.
Religion - HB 1007 prevents religious leaders from being compelled to performance marriage ceremonies which contradict their religious beliefs.

2016 Legislative Session

Failed
2016 Legislative Session
Education - HB 2949 would have created a statewide school voucher program.

Major Events
Ervin Yen was sworn into the Oklahoma Senate becoming the first Asian-American legislator in Oklahoma.

Leadership

Since the Republican Party holds the majority of seats in both the Oklahoma Senate and Oklahoma House of Representatives, they hold the top leadership positions in both chambers.

In Oklahoma, the lieutenant governor serves as President of the Oklahoma Senate, meaning that he serves as the presiding officer in ceremonial instances and can provide a tie-breaking vote. Todd Lamb serves as the current Lieutenant Governor of Oklahoma. The current President pro tempore of the Oklahoma Senate, who presides over the state senate on the majority of session days is Brian Bingman. He is aided by Majority Floor Leader Mike Schulz. The Democratic Minority leader of the state senate is Randy Bass. Paul Ziriax serves as the Secretary of the Oklahoma Senate.

The Oklahoma House of Representatives is led by Speaker Jeff W. Hickman. The Democratic Minority leader is Scott Inman. Joel Kintsel serves as Chief Clerk of the Oklahoma House of Representatives.

Membership

Senate

House of Representatives

References

External links
 Oklahoma Legislature Homepage
 State of Oklahoma's Website
 Legislative Bill Tracking Website

Oklahoma legislative sessions
2015 in Oklahoma
2016 in Oklahoma
2015 U.S. legislative sessions
2016 U.S. legislative sessions